Lincoln Maupin Cummings (June 9, 1910 ) was an American lawyer, judge, and politician in Fayetteville, Arkansas. He served in the Arkansas General Assembly from 1935 to 1943, in the Arkansas National Guard during World War II, and as a circuit judge for almost 30 years after returning to Fayetteville.

Early life
Cummings was born June 9, 1910, in Prairie Grove, Arkansas to Hugh Douglas Cummings and Bess (née Maupin) Cummings. He had four sisters. He attended Prairie Grove School District and the University of Arkansas, and was admitted to the Arkansas Bar Association in 1934, and opened a private law practice in Fayetteville, Arkansas. Shortly thereafter, he won election to the Arkansas House of Representatives for the 50th Arkansas General Assembly. Cummings represented Washington County, Arkansas alongside Ella B. Hurst and D. E. Eicher. Following a two-year term, Cummings was elected to represent the 5th district (Washington County) the Arkansas Senate during the 51st Arkansas General Assembly. Following redistricting, he was reelected to the 2nd district (Washington and Madison counties) in the 52nd Arkansas General Assembly and 53rd Arkansas General Assembly.

He also served on the board of the Council of State Governments from 1935 to 1941.

World War II
Cummings served in the Arkansas National Guard, 142nd Field Artillery from 1940 to 1945 during World War II. He served two years in Europe as an operations officer for the First Army, and as an instructor at Fort Sill in Oklahoma. Cummings graduated from the Command and General Staff School at Fort Leavenworth.

Circuit Judge
Cummings served in the circuit court covering the Northwest Arkansas counties for 29 years. During the period, he dominated the judicial system of Washington County. He was a staunch Democrat and supporter of Bill Clinton during his early political career.

Legacy
The road serving the Kessler Mountain Regional Park in southern Fayetteville is named Judge Cummings Road.

See also
Lee Seamster

References

1910 births
2006 deaths
Arkansas lawyers
Arkansas Democrats
Arkansas circuit court judges
People from Fayetteville, Arkansas
20th-century American judges
20th-century American lawyers
20th-century American politicians
University of Arkansas alumni
Arkansas state senators
Members of the Arkansas House of Representatives